"Jam Side Down" is a single released by the British rock band Status Quo in August 2002. It was included on the album Heavy Traffic. The song reached number 17 on the UK Singles Chart and number 12 in Scotland. Status Quo made a video of this song together with the Royal Navy, on board the aircraft carrier  escorted by destroyers.

Track listings
UK CD1
 "Jam Side Down  – 3:27
 "The Madness  – 3:55
 "Jam Side Down" (CD-ROM video) (filmed aboard ) – 3:27

UK CD2
 "Jam Side Down  – 3:27
 "Down Down" (recorded live at Top of the Pops 2, 22 November 2000)  – 5:00
 "Rockin' All Over the World" (recorded live at Top of the Pops 2, 22 November 2000)  – 3:45

Charts

References

Status Quo (band) songs
2002 singles
Songs written by Charlie Dore
Songs written by Terry Britten